Angel comic book refers to one of two series published by Dark Horse Comics during 2000–2002. Both of these series are based on the television series Angel, and were published while the television series was on air. The first volume was an ongoing series halted after seventeen issues. The second volume was a mini-series, spanning four issues. Various related works have come out coinciding with these volumes.

In 2005, IDW Publishing picked up the rights and began publishing various Angel related mini-series and one-shots set during and after the show's final season (these series are considered non-canonical). In 2007, IDW began publishing Angel: After the Fall, which is considered the canonical Angel season 6 (following the success of Buffy the Vampire Slayer Season Eight from Dark Horse) and is overseen by the show's creator Joss Whedon. IDW continued to publish an Angel ongoing title until Whedon transferred the rights to the character back to Dark Horse, where he will feature as part of the Buffy Season Nine franchise, starring most prominently in the ongoing series Angel and Faith.

Dark Horse Comics

Angel: The Hollower (1999)

TV Guide Ultimate Cable (1999)

Angel Classics (1999–2001) 
{| style="width: 100%;" class="wikitable"
|-
! style="background: #2A426E; color: white;" |#
! style="background: #2A426E; color: white;" |Title
! style="background: #2A426E; color: white;" |Writer(s)
! style="background: #2A426E; color: white;" |Artist(s)
! style="background: #2A426E; color: white;" |Release Date
! style="background: #2A426E; color: white;" |Reprinted in
|-
|1–3
|"Surrogates"
|Christopher Golden
|Penciller(s): Christian Zanier, Marvin Mariano
Inker(s): Andy Owens

Colorist(s): Digital Broome
|November 10, 1999
December 22, 1999

January 12, 2000
|Surrogates
Angel Omnibus (Dark Horse comic)
|-
| style="text-align:left; font-weight:normal; background:#fff; border-bottom:3px solid #2a426e;" colspan="6"|Angel must solve a case involving a demonic fertility clinic, when he finds a rash of murdered mothers, and their husbands turned into zombie-like guards. Assisted by Cordelia Chase and Allen Francis Doyle (simply referred to as Doyle), Angel is able to uncover the mystery, but Angel is thrown into a well for his troubles. Escaping his captivity just in time to survive the harsh light of day, Angel and his gang are able to stop the clinic. Set early in Angel first season, before the episode "Hero". Collected in Angel: Surrogates.
|-
|4
|"The Changeling Wife"
|Christopher Golden
|Penciller(s): Eric Powell
Inker(s): Eric Powell

Colorist(s): Guy Major
|February 9, 2000
|Strange Bedfellows
Angel Omnibus (Dark Horse comic)
|-
| style="text-align:left; font-weight:normal; background:#fff; border-bottom:3px solid #2a426e;" colspan="6"|In Los Angeles, things can often not be what they seem. Angel attempts to help a woman who is trapped in an abusive marriage, however Angel is not seeing where the danger really lies. Collected in Angel: Strange Bedfellows.
|-
|5–7
|"Earthly Possessions"
|Christopher Golden & Thomas E. Sniegoski
|Penciller(s): Christian Zanier
Inker(s): Andy Owens

Colorist(s): Guy Major
|March 8, 2000
April 12, 2000

May 10, 2000
|Earthly Possessions
Angel Omnibus (Dark Horse comic)
|-
| style="text-align:left; font-weight:normal; background:#fff; border-bottom:3px solid #2a426e;" colspan="6"|Angel attempts to drive a demon out of a possessed lawyer; Father Noe is an excommunicated priest who gives him a hand. Noe seems to hold expert knowledge on removing demonic forces. He is known to some as "The Exorcist to the Stars." However, there may be a darker reason for his success. Supposed to be set early in Angels first season, before the episode "Hero". Collected in Angel: Earthly Possessions.
|-
|8–9
|"Beneath the Surface"
|Christopher Golden & Thomas E. Sniegoski
|Penciller(s): Eric Powell & Paul LeeInker(s): Eric Powell & Brian HortonColorist(s): Matt Hollingsworth & Lee Loughridge
|June 14, 2000
July 12, 2000
|Hunting Ground
Angel Omnibus (Dark Horse comic)
|-
| style="text-align:left; font-weight:normal; background:#fff; border-bottom:3px solid #2a426e;" colspan="6"|A murderer is leaving corpses across L.A. sewers, and the evidence found by Detective Kate Lockley suggests Angel is responsible. Angel does not know which demon or monster is trying to set him up. In the other story Cordelia lands the main role in a Blair Witch type film about three film makers looking for the Helm of Haraxis. However the film is a sham and the Helm's the real thing. Angel tries to rescue Cordelia and the other film makers. Collected in Angel: Hunting Ground.
|-
|10–11
|"Strange Bedfellows"
|Christopher Golden & Thomas E. Sniegoski
|Penciller(s): Christian ZanierInker(s): Andy OwensColorist(s): Lee Loughridge
|August 9, 2000
September 13, 2000
|Strange Bedfellows
Angel Omnibus (Dark Horse comic)
|-
| style="text-align:left; font-weight:normal; background:#fff; border-bottom:3px solid #2a426e;" colspan="6"|A Californian congressman is robbed and killed by a woman of the night, a front-page sleaze scandal emerges with a scary twist: Cordy has a vision of the congressman just before his death, it seems the prostitute who murdered him was not human. Angel must find the inhuman assassin. Detective Kate Lockley eventually becomes involved in the case, while Angel and Wesley continue their attempt to discover the vampire-prostitute known on the streets by the name of Candy. They find a vampire bordello controlled by an ancient and seductive vampire has her eyes on Angel. He must face both a large group of vampires, and a battle the much stronger force of lust. Set in the first season of Angel. Collected in Angel: Strange Bedfellows.
|-
|12–13
|"Vermin"
|Christopher Golden & Thomas E. Sniegoski
|Penciller(s): Eric Powell & Christian ZanierInker(s): Andy Owens, Andrew Pepoy, Mark Heike, Clayton Brown, Chris Ivy, Derek Fridolfs & Jason MooreColorist(s): Lee Loughridge
|October 11, 2000
November 8, 2000
| rowspan="2" |Autumnal
Angel Omnibus (Dark Horse comic)
|-
|14
|"Little Girl Lost"
|Christopher Golden & Thomas E. Sniegoski
|Penciller(s): Eric PowellInker(s): Jason MooreColorist(s): Lee Loughridge
|December 13, 2000
|-
| style="text-align:left; font-weight:normal; background:#fff; border-bottom:3px solid #2a426e;" colspan="6"|Angel looks in an abandoned amusement park to find and rescue a young girl from a gang of kidnappers. The thugs aren't the only things Angel face. Angel, the girl, and the criminals must fight their way past a huge number of demonic rats! It seems Angel has a dislike of the furry rodents. Angel later investigates a series of bizarre deaths which seem to be caused by spontaneous combustion. Angel soon associates the deaths with a teen runaway and a demon magic-user. Collected in Angel: Autumnal.
|-
|15–16
|"Past Lives"
(Parts 1 & 3, crossover with Buffy series)
|Christopher Golden & Thomas E. Sniegoski
|Penciller(s): Christian Zanier, Cliff RichardsInker(s): Joe Pimentel, Digital JumpColorist(s): Lee Loughridge
|January 17, 2001
February 2001
|Past Lives
BtVS Omnibus Vol. 6
|-
| style="text-align:left; font-weight:normal; background:#fff; border-bottom:3px solid #2a426e;" colspan="6"|A crossover with Buffy the Vampire Slayer issue #29–30 (collected in Buffy the Vampire Slayer: Past Lives). A huntress is tracking demons in L.A. This would normally seem to be a good thing, except leaving survivors to tell Angel that she sent them. Angel has a huge horde of demons trying to track him for revenge. His human friends, Cordelia and Wesley will soon no longer be safe, unless Angel can do something. At the same time monsters are leaving L.A. and trying to find refuge at Sunnydale. Buffy, Giles, and the others learn about recent chaos, and Buffy believes she should go to help Angel in L.A. Riley is displeased with such developments.
|-
|17
|"Cordelia"
|Christopher Golden & Thomas E. Sniegoski
|Penciller(s): Eric PowellInker(s): Jason MooreColorist(s):''' Lee Loughridge
|April 11, 2001
|Strange Bedfellows
Angel Omnibus (Dark Horse comic)
|-
| style="text-align:left; font-weight:normal; background:#fff; border-bottom:3px solid #2a426e;" colspan="6"|The Angel Investigations office has been blown up after the events of "To Shanshu in L.A.". The dark forces have discovered where Angel and Wesley live and are now forced to stash their demonic items at Cordy's haunted apartment. Dennis makes his presence felt. Collected in Angel: Strange Bedfellows.
|}

 Dark Horse Presents (2000) 

 Dark Horse Extra (2000) 

 Angel mini-series (2002) 
Promoted as "Angel retooled and reinvented" by Dark Horse Comics, the storyline represents an attempt to make Angel a comic-book hero in a more traditional sense, battling against huge behemoths of monsters, and they were the final Angel comics until IDW began publishing them in 2005. Not to be confused with the Angel episode, "Long Day's Journey", or the Angel novel, "The Longest Night".

Angel's searching for a kidnapped child, only to stumble upon a force of unspeakable evil and unimaginable power, seeking him for some reason. Angel ends up fighting a walking volcano, and must try and survive long enough to discover who or what is behind the recent strange series of events. Finally, the strange evil reveals itself; Perfect Zheng, a vampire who beat Angel up in the 1920s. Angel, Wesley, Cordelia, and Gunn try to put the pieces together in time to make sense of present events, a possible product of Angel's past encounter with Zheng. In fact, as it turns out, the gypsy curse that was used on Angel was meant to be used on Zheng, turning him into the 'vampire champion', but it didn't take, and Zheng is determined to find out why Angel's soul was restored and his wasn't. A battle for survival between the pair ensues, which Angel wins. Supposed to be set early in the second season of Angel. Collected in Angel: Long Night's Journey.

 Angel & Faith (2011-2017) 

 Volume 1 

 Volume 2 

 Volume 3 

 IDW Publishing 
IDW released various, loosely connected mini-series and one-shots before launching a new ongoing Angel series in late 2007.

 Mini-series (2005-2010) 

 One-shots (2005–2010) 

 Angel: Spotlight (2006) 
A series of spotlight issues focussing on one character's motivations (although they are sometimes assisted by an additional character). Each one-shot featured a number of variant covers, illustrated by Russell Walks, Lee Kohse, Steph Stamb or was a retailer incentive photo.

 After the Fall (2007-2011) 

 Episodes 

 Mini-series 

 One-shots 

 Trade Paperbacks 
 Angel: After the Fall (Part One)
 Angel: First Night (Part Two)
 Angel: After the Fall (Part Three)
 Angel: After the Fall (Part Four)
 Angel: After the Fall (Premiere Edition)
 Angel: Aftermath (Part Five)
 Angel: Last Angel in Hell (Part Six)
 Immortality for Dummies
 Crown Prince Syndrome
 The Wolf, the Ram, and the Heart
 The End
 Only Human Spike: After the Fall Spike: The Devil You Know llyria: Haunted Angel: Season Six, Vol. 1

BOOM! Studios (2019-2020)

In 2019, a new Angel comic book series was released by Boom! Studios; this version of the series is a reboot with no continuity to the television series or previous comics.

Angel (2019)

Angel & Spike (2020)

Angel (2022)

 Trade Paperbacks 

 Dark Horse Comics 
 Surrogates
 Earthly Possessions
 Hunting Ground
 Autumnal
 Strange Bedfellows
 The Hollower
 Angel Omnibus (Dark Horse comic)

 IDW Publishing 
 The Curse
 Old Friends
 Auld Lang Syne
 Shadow Puppets
 Smile Time
 Blood and Trenches
 Not Fade Away
 A Hole in the World
 Barbary Coast
 Masks
 Angel: Spotlight
 Angel Omnibus (IDW comic) Vol. 1
 Angel Omnibus (IDW comic) Vol. 2
 Angel: The John Byrne Collection
 Spike
 Spike vs. Dracula
 Spike: 100-Page Spectacular''
 Spike: Asylum
 Spike Omnibus

BOOM! Studios 
 Being Human
 City of Demons
 All the Devils Are Here
 What's Done is Denied
 Parallel Hell

Canonical issues

Angel comics are not usually considered by fans as canonical. Some fans consider them stories from the imaginations of authors and artists, while other fans consider them as taking place in an alternative fictional reality. However unlike fan fiction, overviews summarizing their story, written early in the writing process, were 'approved' by both Fox and Joss Whedon (or his office), and the books were therefore later published as official Angel merchandise.

References 

2000 comics debuts
 
Comics based on Buffy the Vampire Slayer